A Desperate Adventure is a 1938 American comedy film directed by John H. Auer and written by Barry Trivers. The film stars Ramon Novarro, Marian Marsh, Eric Blore, Andrew Tombes, Margaret Tallichet and Tom Rutherford. The film was released on August 6, 1938, by Republic Pictures.

Plot

Cast 
Ramon Novarro as André Friezan
Marian Marsh as Ann Carrington
Eric Blore as Trump
Andrew Tombes as Cosmo Carrington
Margaret Tallichet as Betty Carrington
Tom Rutherford as Gerald Richards
Maurice Cass as Dornay
Ernő Verebes as Marcel
Michael Kent as Maurice
Cliff Nazarro as Tipo
Rolfe Sedan as Prefect of Police
Gloria Rich as Mimi
Lois Collier as Angela

References

External links
 

1938 films
1930s English-language films
American comedy films
1938 comedy films
Republic Pictures films
Films directed by John H. Auer
American black-and-white films
1930s American films